Robert Lloyd Dye (born May 16, 1937)  is an American former basketball coach.

Early life and college years
Born in Los Angeles, Dye graduated from Downey High School in nearby Downey, California in 1956. Dye enrolled at Fullerton Junior College and played on the basketball team there from 1956 to 1958.  He transferred to Idaho State University and played on the Bengals basketball team from 1960 to 1962 and graduated from Idaho State in 1962.

Coaching career
Dye returned to the Los Angeles area after earning his degree and served as head boys' basketball coach at St. John Bosco High School of Bellflower, California from 1962 to 1965. St. John Bosco made a school-high 18–7 record in the 1963–64 season. From 1965 to 1967, Dye was an assistant coach at Cerritos Junior College. Dye again became a head coach in 1967, this time at Santa Monica City College (which became Santa Monica College in 1971). Santa Monica won the 1972 California junior college championship with a 26–5 record, and Dye had a 115–50 overall record in seven seasons (1967–1973) with Santa Monica.

In 1973, Dye became head men's basketball coach at Cal State Fullerton, a program then in transition from NCAA Division II to Division I. Cal State Fullerton moved to Division I by the 1974–75 season and was a member of the Pacific Coast Athletic Association (PCAA). Dye coached Cal State Fullerton to the 1976 PCAA regular season title and 1978 PCAA tournament championship, and Cal State Fullerton made the West Regional Final of the 1978 NCAA tournament in what was considered a Cinderella run.  Dye had a 110–77 record in seven seasons with Cal State Fullerton from 1973 to 1980.

Dye applied for the head coaching job at San Diego State for the 1980–81 season but was rejected; he took that season off.  In 1981, Dye became head coach of Division II Cal State Bakersfield; the program made the 1982 and 1983 NCAA tournaments.

First-year Boise State University athletics director Gene Bleymaier hired Dye as head coach in 1983, and Dye's first season with the Boise State Broncos was 15–13, ending seven straight losing seasons and making men's basketball nearly as popular as football. With Dye as head coach, Boise State made the NCAA tournament in 1988, 1993, and 1994, and the NIT in 1987, 1989, and 1991. Dye resigned from Boise State in August 1995 with a 213–133 record in his 12 seasons.

In 1996, Dye took his first coaching job in professional basketball as the head coach of the Idaho Stampede, an expansion team that would begin playing in the Continental Basketball Association (CBA) in the 1997–98 season. Dye also served as director of basketball operations of the team, which was the first professional basketball team in the state of Idaho. The Stampede went 25–31 in its inaugural season.

As of 2011, Dye is retired and lives in Carlsbad, California. He is married and has two children and two grandchildren.

Head coaching record
Source:

Junior college

College

CBA

|-
| align="left" |Idaho Stampede
| align="left" |1997–98
|56||25||31||||| 4th in National ||5||2||3||||Lost First Round
|-class="sortbottom"
| align="left" |Career
| ||56||25||31|||| ||||||||||

References

External links
Sports-reference stats

1937 births
Living people
American men's basketball players
Basketball coaches from California
Basketball players from Los Angeles
Boise State Broncos men's basketball coaches
Cal State Bakersfield Roadrunners men's basketball coaches
Cal State Fullerton Titans men's basketball coaches
Fullerton Hornets men's basketball players
High school basketball coaches in the United States
Idaho Stampede (CBA) coaches
Idaho State Bengals men's basketball players
Santa Monica Corsairs men's basketball coaches
Sportspeople from Carlsbad, California
Sportspeople from Downey, California